In organic chemistry, an epoxide is a cyclic ether, where the ether forms a three-atom ring: two atoms of carbon and one atom of oxygen.  This triangular structure has substantial ring strain, making epoxides highly reactive, more so than other ethers.  They are produced on a large scale for many applications.  In general, low molecular weight epoxides are colourless and nonpolar, and often volatile.

Nomenclature
A compound containing the epoxide functional group can be called an epoxy, epoxide, oxirane, and ethoxyline.  Simple epoxides are often referred to as oxides.  Thus, the epoxide of ethylene (C2H4) is ethylene oxide (C2H4O).  Many compounds have trivial names; for instance, ethylene oxide is called "oxirane". Some names emphasize the presence of the epoxide functional group, as in the compound 1,2-epoxyheptane, which can also be called 1,2-heptene oxide.

A polymer formed from epoxide precursors is called an epoxy, but such materials do not contain epoxide groups (or contain only a few residual epoxy groups that remain unreacted in the formation of the resin).

Synthesis
The dominant epoxides industrially are ethylene oxide and propylene oxide, which are produced respectively on the scales of approximately 15 and 3 million tonnes/year.

Heterogeneously catalyzed oxidation of alkenes
The epoxidation of ethylene involves its reaction with oxygen. According to a reaction mechanism suggested in 1974 at least one ethylene molecule is totally oxidized for every six that are converted to ethylene oxide:

7 H2C=CH2  +  6 O2  ->  6 C2H4O  +  2 CO2  +  2 H2O

The direct reaction of oxygen with alkenes is useful only for this epoxide. Modified heterogeneous silver catalysts are typically employed. Other alkenes fail to react usefully, even propylene, though TS-1 supported Au catalysts can perform propylene epoxidation selectively.

Olefin (alkene) oxidation using organic peroxides and metal catalysts
Aside from ethylene oxide, most epoxides are generated by treating alkenes with peroxide-containing reagents, which donate a single oxygen atom. Safety considerations weigh on these reactions because organic peroxides are prone to spontaneous decomposition or even combustion.

Metal complexes are useful catalysts for epoxidations involving hydrogen peroxide and alkyl hydroperoxides. Peroxycarboxylic acids, which are more electrophilic, convert alkenes to epoxides without the intervention of metal catalysts. In specialized applications, other peroxide-containing reagents are employed, such as dimethyldioxirane.  Depending on the mechanism of the reaction and the geometry of the alkene starting material, cis and/or trans epoxide diastereomers may be formed. In addition, if there are other stereocenters present in the starting material, they can influence the stereochemistry of the epoxidation. Metal-catalyzed epoxidations were first explored using tert-butyl hydroperoxide (TBHP).  Association of TBHP with the metal (M) generates the active metal peroxy complex containing the MOOR group, which then transfers an O center to the alkene.

Organic peroxides are used for the production of propylene oxide from propylene. Catalysts are required as well. Both t-butyl hydroperoxide and ethylbenzene hydroperoxide can be used as oxygen sources.

Olefin peroxidation using peroxycarboxylic acids
More typically for laboratory operations, the Prilezhaev reaction is employed. This approach involves the oxidation of the alkene with a peroxyacid such as m-CPBA. Illustrative is the epoxidation of styrene with perbenzoic acid to styrene oxide:

The reaction proceeds via what is commonly known as the "Butterfly Mechanism". The peroxide is viewed as an electrophile, and the alkene a nucleophile. The reaction is considered to be concerted (the numbers in the mechanism below are for simplification). The butterfly mechanism allows ideal positioning of the  sigma star orbital for  π electrons to attack. Because two bonds are broken and formed to the epoxide oxygen, this is formally an example of a coarctate transition state.

Hydroperoxides are also employed in catalytic enantioselective epoxidations, such as the Sharpless epoxidation and the Jacobsen epoxidation. Together with the Shi epoxidation, these reactions are useful for the enantioselective synthesis of chiral epoxides. Oxaziridine reagents may also be used to generate epoxides from alkenes.

Homogeneously catalysed asymmetric epoxidations
Arene oxides are intermediates in the oxidation of arenes by cytochrome P450. For prochiral arenes (naphthalene, toluene, benzoates, benzopyrene), the epoxides are often obtained in high enantioselectivity.

Chiral epoxides can often be derived enantioselectively from prochiral alkenes. Many metal complexes give active catalysts, but the most important involve titanium, vanadium, and molybdenum.

The Sharpless epoxidation reaction is one of the premier enantioselective chemical reactions. It is used to prepare 2,3-epoxyalcohols from primary and secondary allylic alcohols.

Intramolecular SN2 substitution
This method involves dehydrohalogenation. It is a variant of the Williamson ether synthesis. In this case, an alkoxide ion intramolecularly displaces chloride. The precursor compounds are  called halohydrins and can be generated through halohydration of an alkene. Starting with propylene chlorohydrin, most of the world's supply of propylene oxide arises via this route.

An intramolecular epoxide formation reaction is one of the key steps in the Darzens reaction.

In the Johnson–Corey–Chaykovsky reaction epoxides are generated from carbonyl groups and sulfonium ylides. In this reaction, a sulfonium is the leaving group instead of chloride.

Nucleophilic epoxidation
Electron-deficient olefins, such as enones and acryl derivatives can be epoxidized using nucleophilic oxygen compounds such as peroxides. The reaction is a two-step mechanism. First the oxygen performs a nucleophilic conjugate addition to give a stabilized carbanion. This carbanion then attacks the same oxygen atom, displacing a leaving group from it, to close the epoxide ring.

Biosynthesis
Epoxides are uncommon in nature. They arise usually via oxygenation of alkenes by the action of cytochrome P450. (but see also the short-lived epoxyeicosatrienoic acids which act as signalling molecules. and similar epoxydocosapentaenoic acids, and epoxyeicosatetraenoic acids.)

Reactions 
Ring-opening reactions dominate the reactivity of epoxides.

Hydrolysis and addition of nucleophiles

Epoxides react with a broad range of nucleophiles, for example, alcohols, water, amines, thiols, and even halides. With two often nearly equivalent sites of attack, epoxides are examples "ambident substrates."  The regioselectivity of ring-opening reactions of non-symmetrical epoxides is sensitive to conditions, This class of reactions is the basis of epoxy glues and the production of glycols.

Polymerization and oligomerization
Polymerization of epoxides gives polyethers. For example ethylene oxide polymerizes to give polyethylene glycol, also known as polyethylene oxide. The reaction of an alcohol or a phenol with ethylene oxide, ethoxylation, is widely used to produce surfactants:
ROH  +  n C2H4O   →   R(OC2H4)nOH

With anhydrides, epoxides give polyesters.

Deoxygenation
Epoxides can be deoxygenated using oxophilic reagents. This reaction can proceed with loss or retention of configuration. The combination of tungsten hexachloride and n-butyllithium gives the alkene.

Other reactions
 Reduction of an epoxide  with lithium aluminium hydride or aluminium hydride  produces the corresponding alcohol. This reduction process results from the nucleophilic addition of hydride (H−).
 Reductive cleavage of epoxides gives β-lithioalkoxides.
 Reduction with tungsten hexachloride and n-butyllithium generates the alkene
 Epoxides undergo ring expansion reactions, illustrated by the insertion of carbon dioxide to give cyclic carbonates.
 When treated with thiourea, epoxides convert to the episulfide, which are called thiiranes.

Uses

Ethylene oxide is widely used to generate detergents and surfactants by ethoxylation. Its hydrolysis affords ethylene glycol. It is also used for sterilisation of medical instruments and materials.

The reaction of epoxides with amines is the basis for the formation of epoxy glues and structural materials. A typical amine-hardener is triethylenetetramine (TETA).

Safety
Epoxides are alkylating agents, making many of them highly toxic.

See also 
 Epoxide hydrolase
 Juliá–Colonna epoxidation

References 

 
Functional groups